Anochetus nietneri is a species of ant of the subfamily Ponerinae, which can be found from Sri Lanka.

References

External links

 at antwiki.org
Animaldiversity.org
Itis.org

Ponerinae
Hymenoptera of Asia
Insects described in 1861
Taxa named by Julius Roger